A conjunctive adverb, adverbial conjunction, or subordinating adverb is an adverb that connects two clauses by converting the clause it introduces into an adverbial modifier of the verb in the main clause. For example, in "I told him; thus, he knows" and "I told him. Thus, he knows", thus is a conjunctive adverb.

Examples 
Some examples containing conjunctive adverbs are:

Bob loved Mary with all his heart; however, he knew he could not be with her.

I cleaned my room; then I went to the store.

I cleaned my room, and then I went to the store.

Logic 
The clause that a conjunctive adverb introduces invariably modifies a (usually previously expressed) logical predication. Specific conjunctive adverbs are used to signal and signify purpose or reason (so that), sequence (then, since), exception (though), and comparison (whereas).

Common English conjunctive adverbs 

Some common English conjunctive adverbs are:

accordingly
also
anyway
besides
certainly
consequently
finally
furthermore
hence
however
in addition
in fact
incidentally
indeed
instead
lately
likewise
meanwhile
moreover
nevertheless
next
nonetheless
now
otherwise
rather
similarly
since
still
subsequently
then
thereby
therefore
thus

English punctuation 

Conjunctive adverbs are preceded by a semicolon or a period (full stop). They are usually followed by a comma. For example, "I told him; however, he did not remember" and "I told him. However, he did not remember" are both valid.

See also 
 Conjunction (grammar)
 Transition words

References

Online sources 

Adverbs by type